

See also 
 United States House of Representatives elections, 1808 and 1809
 List of United States representatives from New Hampshire

1808
New Hampshire
United States House of Representatives